is a railway station on the Ainokaze Toyama Railway Line in the city of Toyama, Toyama Prefecture, Japan, operated by the third-sector railway operator Ainokaze Toyama Railway.  It is also a freight terminal for the Japan Freight Railway Company.

Lines

Station layout 
Higashi-Toyama Station has one side platform and one island platform connected by a footbridge. The station is staffed.

Platforms

History
Higashi-Toyama Station opened on 16 November 1908 as a station on the Japanese Government Railways (JGR), later becoming the Japanese National Railways (JNR). It was privatized on 1 April 1987, coming under the control of JR West.

From this date, Higashi-Toyama Station was transferred to the ownership of the third-sector operating company Ainokaze Toyama Railway.

Adjacent stations

Passenger statistics
In fiscal 2015, the station was used by an average of 1,399 passengers daily (boarding passengers only).

Surrounding area 
 Toyama Municipal Baseball Stadium Alpen Stadium

See also
 List of railway stations in Japan

References

External links

  

Railway stations in Toyama Prefecture
Railway stations in Japan opened in 1908
Ainokaze Toyama Railway Line
Stations of Japan Freight Railway Company
Toyama (city)